Merethe Nergaard, a Norwegian diplomat since 1984, was Deputy Director of the Ministry of Foreign Affairs (1997–1999), Ambassador to Mexico 2013–2017 and Ambassador to Rabat from 2017.

References

Norwegian women ambassadors
Year of birth missing (living people)
Living people
Ambassadors of Norway to Mexico
Ambassadors of Norway to Morocco